Ha Yoo-mi (born July 7, 1963) is a South Korean actress. Ha received acting recognition for her supporting roles in the television dramas My Husband's Woman (2007) and Queen of Reversals (2010).

Filmography

Film

Television series

Variety show

Awards and nominations

References

External links
 
 
 

1963 births
Living people
South Korean television actresses
South Korean film actresses